Perverting the course of justice is an offence committed when a person prevents justice from being served on themselves or on another party. In England and Wales it is a common law offence, carrying a maximum sentence of life imprisonment. Statutory versions of the offence exist in Australia, Canada, Ireland, and New Zealand. The Scottish equivalent is defeating the ends of justice, while the South African counterpart is defeating or obstructing the course of justice. A similar concept, obstruction of justice, exists in United States law.

England and Wales
Doing an act tending and intending to pervert the course of public justice is an offence under the common law of England and Wales.

Perverting the course of justice can be any of three acts:
 Fabricating or disposing of evidence
 Intimidating or threatening a witness or juror
 Intimidating or threatening a judge

Also criminal are:
 conspiring with another to pervert the course of justice, and
 intending to pervert the course of justice

This offence, and the subject matter of the related forms of criminal conspiracy, have been referred to as: 
Perverting the course of justice
Interfering with the administration of justice
Obstructing the administration of justice
Obstructing the course of justice
Defeating the due course of justice
Defeating the ends of justice
Effecting a public mischief

This proliferation of alternative names has been described as "somewhat confusing".

This offence is also sometimes referred to as "attempting to pervert the course of justice". This is potentially misleading. An attempt to pervert the course of justice is a substantive common law offence and not an inchoate offence. It is not a form of the offence of attempt, and it would be erroneous to charge it as being contrary to section 1(1) of the Criminal Attempts Act 1981.

This offence is triable only on indictment.

Canada
In Canada, the equivalent offence is referred to as "obstructing justice".  It is set out in § 139 of the Criminal Code:

Australia

In New South Wales, the equivalent offence is set out in Section 319 of the Crimes Act 1900 (NSW). The maximum penalty is 14 years' imprisonment. In 1985 Murray Farquhar, the former Chief Stipendiary Magistrate of New South Wales, was convicted of attempting to pervert the course of justice to have charges against Kevin Humphreys dismissed and sentenced to a maximum of four years in prison. In 2009 Marcus Einfeld, a former Judge of the Federal Court of Australia, was sentenced to a maximum of three years in prison after pleading guilty to making a false statement with intent to pervert the course of justice.

Notable convictions
Jonathan Aitken, a politician and British government cabinet ministerperjury and perverting the course of justice
Jeffrey Archer, an English author and former politicianperjury and perverting the course of justice
Ali Dizaei, a former commander in London's Metropolitan Police Serviceinitially found guilty of perverting the course of justice and gaoled; later released on appeal; subsequently re-convicted
Chris Huhne, a journalist and former British government cabinet minister and his former wife, Vicky Pryceperverting the course of justice (see R v Huhne and Pryce)
John Humble, a former labourerperverting the course of justice
Bruce Hyman, an English barristerperverting the course of justice
Karen Matthews and Michael Donovanfound guilty of kidnapping, false imprisonment, and perverting the course of justice

Australia
Marcus Einfeld, an Australian retired Federal Court and NSW, WA and ACT Supreme Court judgeperjury and perverting the course of justice, for lying relative to a speeding ticket
Lionel Murphy, an Australian former politician and High Court of Australia judgeinitially found guilty of perverting the course of justice; the NSW Appeal Court subsequently quashed the conviction and ordered a retrial; subsequently found not guilty

See also

Compounding a felony
Compounding treason
Contempt of court
Embracery
Misprision of felony
Misprision of treason
United Nations Convention against Corruption

References

Perjury and Perversion of the Course of Justice Considered (PDF), a primer on the legal details of the offence.

External links

 
Abuse of the legal system
Crimes
Deception
English criminal law
Common law offences in England and Wales